Workin or Workin' may refer to:

 Workin' with The Miles Davis Quintet, an album recorded in 1956 by Miles Davis
 Workin' (Shirley Scott album), 1967
"Workin" (song), 2015 Puff Dady song

See also

Working (disambiguation)